Lewis Kidd may refer to:
 Lewis Kidd (footballer)
 Lewis Kidd (American football)